Willy Padrutt (26 July 1928 – 31 October 2022) was a Swiss jurist. He served as Attorney General of the Swiss Confederation from 1990 to 1993.

Padrutt died in Chur on 31 October 2022, at the age of 94.

References

1928 births
2022 deaths
Swiss jurists
University of Bern alumni
University of Paris alumni
People from Chur